The  is a Bo-1-Bo wheel arrangement DC electric locomotive type formerly operated in Japan from 1974 until 2002 by Japanese National Railways (JNR) and later by JR Freight.

History

The Class ED62 locomotives were created between 1974 and 1979 by modifying the 18 earlier JNR Class ED61 Bo-Bo electric locomotives with the addition of a center non-driven axle. Rebuilding was carried out at JNR's Nagano Works. The primary aim of rebuilding was to reduce the axle load (from 15 t to 13 t) for use on the Iida Line, where the class displaced vintage  (English Electric) and JNR Class ED19 (Westinghouse) locomotives, and later JNR Class EF10 locomotives.

One highlight of the class's career was when ED62 15 hauled the Imperial Train on the Iida Line in 1979. It was also not uncommon to see ED62s close to Tokyo when they worked to Shin-Tsurumi Depot for examinations.

Eight members of the class were still in service in 1987 when JNR was split into separate JR Group companies, and ED62 17 was repainted into the new JR Freight livery shortly after. When freight operations ceased on the Iida Line in 1997, the remaining locomotives were placed in storage before finally being withdrawn in 2002.

Build details

Preserved examples
, two Class ED62 locomotives were preserved.
 ED62 1 JR East Nagano depot
 ED62 17 Stored at JR East's Omiya works (standard blue livery)

ED62 14 was also formerly preserved at Sakuma Rail Park.

See also
 Japan Railways locomotive numbering and classification

References

 

Electric locomotives of Japan
1067 mm gauge locomotives of Japan
Bo-1-Bo locomotives
1500 V DC locomotives
Preserved electric locomotives
Railway locomotives introduced in 1974